Memory Lane is a historic home located at Denton, Caroline County, Maryland.  It a -story, frame Italianate-style house constructed in 1864.  Notable exterior features include extensive porches, decorative brackets, and an octagonal cupola. The entire front facade features a wraparound porch.

Memory Lane was listed on the National Register of Historic Places in 2000.

References

External links
, including photo from 1997, at Maryland Historical Trust

Denton, Maryland
Houses in Caroline County, Maryland
Houses on the National Register of Historic Places in Maryland
Italianate architecture in Maryland
Houses completed in 1864
National Register of Historic Places in Caroline County, Maryland